The Hyundai U engine is a series of three or four-cylinder diesel engines made for automotive applications by the Hyundai Kia Automotive Group. The U series of engines includes the smallest automotive diesel engines produced by Hyundai.

1.1 L (D3FA)
The  U diesel engine is a 3-cylinder version of the 1.5L U series unit and is made with cast iron block and aluminum cylinder head with chain driven DOHC with 4 valves per cylinder, Delphi common rail direct injection (CRDi), variable geometry turbocharger (VGT) and intake air swirl control.

The engine also incorporates a 1½ engine order balance shaft mounted under the crankshaft driven by helical gears to manage engine vibration.

Applications
Hyundai i10 (2007–2019)
Hyundai i20 (2008–2020)
Kia Picanto (SA) (2006–2011)
Kia Rio (UB) (2011–2017)

1.2 L (D3FB)
The  U diesel engine utilizes three cylinders and is made with cast iron block and aluminum cylinder head with chain driven DOHC with 4 valves per cylinder.

Applications
Hyundai Aura (2020–present)
Hyundai i10 (2017–present)

1.4 L (D4FC)
The  U diesel engine utilizes four cylinders and is made with cast iron block and aluminum cylinder head with chain driven DOHC with 4 valves per cylinder, Bosch common rail direct injection (CRDi), fixed geometry turbocharger (FGT) and intake air swirl control.

Applications
Hyundai Verna (RB/RC) (2011–2017)
Hyundai Verna (HCi) (2020–present)
Hyundai Creta (GS) (2015–2020) 
Hyundai i20 (2008–2020)
Hyundai i30 (GD) (2011–2017)
Hyundai Venue (QXi) (2019–2020)
Kia Cee'd (JD) (2012–2018)
Kia Rio (UB) (2011–2017)

1.5 L (D4FA)
The  U diesel engine has four cylinders and is made with a cast iron block, aluminum cylinder head with chain driven DOHC (4 valves per cylinder), Bosch common rail direct injection (CRDi), variable geometry turbocharger (VGT) and intake air swirl control. Introduced in 2005 this engine replaced the 1.5L 3-cylinder D-engine common rail Diesel sold in the Hyundai Getz and Accent models which was notably less refined.

Applications
Hyundai Accent (MC) (2005–2010)
Hyundai Alcazar (2021–present)
Hyundai Creta (SU2i) (2020–present)
Hyundai i20 (BI3) (2020–present)
Hyundai Venue (QXi) (2020–present)
Hyundai Verna (HCi) (2020–present)

1.6 L (D4FB)
The  U diesel engine (known as D4FB) from the Žilina Kia factory in Slovakia is a bored-out version of the  U series engine,  versus . It is a "best in class" diesel engine in the world.

Engine specification
Displacement: 
Bore x Stroke: 
Compression Ratio: 17.3:1
Power: ,  or 
Torque: ,  or 

Applications
Hyundai Accent (2010–2020)
Hyundai Creta (GS) (2014–2020)
Hyundai Elantra (AD) (2015–2020)
Hyundai Kona (OS) (2017–2020)
Hyundai i30 (2007–2019)
Kia Carens (UN) (2006–2013) 
Kia Cee'd/Ceed (2006–2018)
Kia Forte/Cerato (2008–2018)
Kia Seltos (2019–present)
Kia Soul (2008–2019)
Kia Stonic (2017–2018)
Kia Venga (YN) (2009–2019)

1.7 L (D4FD)
The  U2 diesel engine (known as D4FD) was introduced at the 2010 Paris Motor Show. This engine features chain driven DOHC with 4 valves per cylinder, common rail direct injection (CRDi), variable geometry turbocharger (VGT).

1.7 CRDI
Displacement: 
 Bore x Stroke: 
 Compression Ratio: 17.0:1
 Power:  or  @ 4,000 rpm
 Torque:  or  @ 2,000–2,500 rpm

Applications
Hyundai i40 (2011–2019)
Hyundai Sonata (LF) (2014–2019)
Hyundai Tucson/ix35 (2010–2018)
Kia Carens (RP) (2013–2019)
Kia Optima (2010–2018)
Kia Sportage (2010–2018)

See also
List of Hyundai engines

References

External links
http://www.hyundaiengine.com/data/ENGINE%20CATALOG.pdf

U
Diesel engines by model
Straight-three engines
Straight-four engines